The Sumrall-Albritton House is a historic house in Quitman, Mississippi, USA. It was built for Jacob Sumrall, who worked for the Mobile and Ohio Railroad. It was designed in the Greek Revival architectural style, and it was completed in 1855. It has been listed on the National Register of Historic Places since May 22, 1980.

References

Houses on the National Register of Historic Places in Mississippi
Greek Revival houses in Mississippi
Houses completed in 1859
Houses in Clarke County, Mississippi
National Register of Historic Places in Clarke County, Mississippi
Antebellum architecture